James Thompson (born 1889 in Bristol) was a male English international table tennis player.

He won a bronze medal at the 1926 World Table Tennis Championships in the men's team event. He was captain of this inaugural Championship England team and used a rubber racket.

He won the West of England Championships in 1908, made his debut against Wales in 1923 and won the inaugural Daily Mirror British title in May 1923 at Selfridges in London, and played in the Bristol league (one of the earliest clubs in the world).

See also
 List of England players at the World Team Table Tennis Championships
 List of World Table Tennis Championships medalists

References

English male table tennis players
1889 births
Sportspeople from Bristol
Year of death missing
World Table Tennis Championships medalists